Konstantinos Alyssandrakis is a Greek politician, who from 1999 until 2004, was a Member of the European Parliament, representing Greece for the Communist Party.

References

Living people
1948 births
MEPs for Greece 1999–2004
Communist Party of Greece MEPs
Politicians from Athens